Tchimbélé is a waterfall in the Woleu-Ntem area of northwestern Gabon. The waterfall is fed by the Komo River and is located west of the settlement of Anzem.

A reservoir is located in the area.

References
World Geographics

Waterfalls of Gabon
Estuaire Province